Roman Bürki (born 14 November 1990) is a Swiss professional footballer who plays as a goalkeeper for Major League Soccer club St. Louis City SC. From 2014 to 2018, he played for the Switzerland national team.

Club career

Switzerland
Bürki began his career in 2007 with the reserve squad of the BSC Young Boys. In 2009, he moved to FC Thun, and half a year later to FC Schaffhausen. In the summer of 2010 he went back to BSC Young Boys, and again half a year later he was transferred to Grasshopper Club Zürich. First, he was the back-up goalkeeper, later the first goalkeeper. He was on loan until 2013, when Grasshoppers bought his rights.

SC Freiburg
On 24 May 2014, he signed a contract with SC Freiburg.

For 2014–15 Bundesliga season he succeeded Oliver Baumann as number one goalkeeper. He played in all 34 games, while being unable to prevent the team from being relegated to 2. Bundesliga.

Borussia Dortmund
On 14 June 2015, he signed for Borussia Dortmund. He made his formal debut for the team on 15 August 2015, in a 4–0 win over Borussia Mönchengladbach. He kept 12 clean sheets for Dortmund in the league, making 33 appearances. In the 2016–17 season, he made 27 league appearances, keeping 9 clean sheets.

In the 2017–18 season, Bürki became the first goalkeeper to keep five clean sheets in the first five Bundesliga games.

St. Louis City SC
On 16 March 2022, Burki agreed to a deal that would send him to Major League Soccer expansion franchise St. Louis City SC for their inaugural season in 2023.

International career

Bürki played for Switzerland U-21 in the 2011 European Under-21 Championship.

In 2014, Bürki was first called up for Switzerland and was also in the  squad for the 2014 World Cup in Brazil. On 18 November 2014, he made his debut in a friendly match against Poland. He was part of the squad for the  2016 European Championships, but never made it to any match. Ultimately, his team was eliminated in the round of 16 away after losing 5–4 on penalties against Poland.

He was included in Switzerland's 23-man squad for the 2018 World Cup.

In 2018, Burki stated that he did not want to be called up to the Switzerland squad in order to focus on the 2018–19 season at Dortmund.

Personal life
Bürki is the older brother of FC Thun defender Marco Bürki.

Career statistics

Club

International

Honours
Grasshoppers
 Swiss Cup: 2012–13

Borussia Dortmund
 DFB-Pokal: 2016–17, 2020–21
 DFL-Supercup: 2019

References

External links

1990 births
Living people
People from Münsingen
Swiss men's footballers
Association football goalkeepers
FC Münsingen players
BSC Young Boys players
FC Thun players
FC Schaffhausen players
Grasshopper Club Zürich players
SC Freiburg players
Borussia Dortmund players
Swiss Super League players
Bundesliga players
MLS Next Pro players
Switzerland youth international footballers
Switzerland under-21 international footballers
Switzerland international footballers
2014 FIFA World Cup players
UEFA Euro 2016 players
2018 FIFA World Cup players
Swiss expatriate footballers
Swiss expatriate sportspeople in Germany
Expatriate footballers in Germany
Sportspeople from the canton of Bern